James Kidd (11 March 1872 – 2 March 1928) was a British Unionist Party politician in Scotland. He sat in the House of Commons from 1918 to 1922, and from 1924 until his death in 1928.

Biography 
He was elected at the 1918 general election as Member of Parliament MP for Linlithgowshire, standing as a Coalition Unionist, that is a supporter of David Lloyd George's Coalition Government. He was defeated at the 1922 general election by the Labour Party candidate Manny Shinwell.

Kidd stood again in 1923 general election, without success. He defeated Shinwell in the 1924 general election and held the seat until his death in 1928, aged 55.

He served briefly as an Under-Secretary of State for Scotland with responsibility for health.

His daughter Dame Margaret Kidd (1900–1989) was a lawyer and sheriff principal from 1960 to 1974, and the first woman to become a member of the Faculty of Advocates.

References

External links 
 

1872 births
1928 deaths
Members of the Parliament of the United Kingdom for Scottish constituencies
UK MPs 1918–1922
UK MPs 1924–1929
Unionist Party (Scotland) MPs